Phlyctaenogastra rangei is a moth in the family Erebidae which was described by Max Gaede in 1915 and found in Namibia and South Africa.

References

Moths described in 1915
Spilosomina